Harvard George Owen Jr. (December 2, 1901 – March 4, 1986) was a Canadian-American professional ice hockey defenceman for the Boston Bruins of the National Hockey League.

Career
Owen was a three-sport star at Harvard University, playing football, baseball and hockey. He was awarded the university's Wingate Cup for best all-around athletic ability.

After he graduated, Owen entered the brokerage business while continuing to play hockey for the Boston University Club. He was invited to play for the United States Olympic Team in 1924, but declined because of business obligations.

The Toronto Maple Leafs held Owen's professional rights; however, as Owen did not want to leave Massachusetts, the Maple Leafs traded his rights to the Boston Bruins on January 10, 1929, in exchange for Eric Pettinger. Owen played five seasons with the Bruins, pairing on defense with players including Lionel Hitchman and Eddie Shore, and won the Stanley Cup with the team in 1929.

Legend has it Owen was the first player to don a helmet in an NHL game, wearing the same leather helmet that he had worn when playing college football. However, Marty Burke of the Montreal Canadiens is known to have worn a helmet briefly during a game in December 1928, before Owen entered the NHL.

Following his playing career, Owen became head coach of the Michigan Tech Huskies men's ice hockey team. He later coached football, baseball and hockey at Milton Academy. After retiring from Milton Academy, Owen worked as a scout for the Pittsburgh Pirates.

Personal life
Owen was born in Hamilton, Ontario and moved to Massachusetts as a teenager, attending Newton High School in suburban Boston.

He died of a stroke in Milton, Massachusetts in 1986.

Halls of Fame
United States Hockey Hall of Fame, 1973 (inaugural class)
College Football Hall of Fame, 1983
Massachusetts Hockey Hall of Fame, 2014

Career statistics

References

External links
 
 Hockey Hall of Fame Biography
 

1901 births
1986 deaths
Boston Athletic Association ice hockey players
Boston Bruins captains
Boston Bruins players
Canadian ice hockey defencemen
College Football Hall of Fame inductees
Harvard Crimson baseball players
Harvard Crimson football players
Harvard Crimson men's ice hockey players
Ice hockey people from Ontario
Sportspeople from Hamilton, Ontario
Stanley Cup champions
United States Hockey Hall of Fame inductees
Canadian emigrants to the United States